Rainworth is a village in the ceremonial county of Nottinghamshire in the East Midlands of England. It is split between the local government districts of Newark and Sherwood and Mansfield.

To the north of Rainworth is the village of Clipstone and to the east are the villages of Bilsthorpe and Farnsfield. Mansfield lies two miles to the west. The village of Blidworth is a mile to the south. The A617 dual-carriageway bypasses the village. The roundabout at the western terminus was the starting point for the Mansfield and Ashfield Regeneration Route. The former route through the village is the B6020.

Toponymy 
In the year 617 AD, a mighty Roman warrior, Readwald, stayed at the site prior to a battle with Ethelfrith, King of Mercia. In the battle, Readwald's son, Regehere, was killed, and from that day, the area was known as Regehere's Wath (Wath being a ford or crossing point over a river). Over the years, many changes in the spelling of the name have been recorded, from the original Regehere's Wath to Reynwath by 1268, then Raynwath, and then further adapted to the present day name of Rainworth.

Locally, some pronounce the modern day spelling as 'Renneth'.

History

Rainworth started as a settlement close to a Roman road that went through Mansfield and Newark, and provided access to the coalfields of Derbyshire for the Roman settlements in the area to the east of Nottinghamshire. The sheltered location and access to clean water from the River Idle (now called Rainworth Water), meant that the area was often used by travelling Romans as a camp site.
In the year 617 AD, a mighty Roman warrior, Readwald, stayed at the site prior to a battle with Ethelfrith, King of Mercia. In the battle, Readwald's son, Regehere, was killed, and from that day, the area was known as Regehere's Wath, and has been further adapted to the present day spelling of Rainworth.
Rainworth Lodge was first built in 1190 as a hunting lodge. Rufus Clarke lived there in 1212 and was with King John's hunting parties in the forest.
Little more is known about the village until the 16th century, when it is recorded that it was a peaceful hamlet with 13 dwellings:
Three Thorn Hollow Farm;
six houses in the Old Square known as Ramsden Croft;
The original Robin Hood Inn, then named the Sherwood Inn;
the toll house, nicknamed The Inkpot; and
five houses on the road leading to Mansfield.
The people who lived in Rainworth were farmers or nurserymen.

Until the opening of the railway line linking Mansfield to Southwell in 1871 there was no public transport and the only way to get from place to place was to walk.
In 1879 an elm tree, later to be called the `Tree of Knowledge` was planted on the village green in front of the Robin Hood Inn. It became a favourite place for people to meet and talk. The tree eventually had to be cut down in 1962 when it became diseased.
In 1890 Rainworth's first church, a wooden building was built. However it was later replaced by a brick building which was opened on the festival day of St Simon and St Jude in 1939.
The building of the pumping station in 1895 meant that householders no longer had to get their water from wells and springs but from the pump outside the Robin Hood Inn.
In 1911, two mineshafts were sunk marking the start of work at Rufford Colliery. Only two years later the colliery suffered its worst pit disaster when 13 men were killed in an accident. As the pit prospered so the need for housing grew and new housing was built along Kirklington Road.
In 1914 the first primary school to be built in Rainworth, Heathlands, was opened. Python Hill School followed in 1924. It was not until 1963 that Joseph Whitaker School opened and Rainworth had its own secondary school. The school is named after the naturalist Joseph Whitaker, who lived for most of his life at Rainworth Lodge on Blidworth Lane.

As well as growth, Rainworth has also seen decline. The local railway service was stopped and the railway station closed in 1965. Also along with many other pits in the area, Rufford Colliery stopped producing coal in 1993.
The colliery provided housing for approximately 400 families and leisure facilities such as a football ground and lido (which was in disuse by the end of the war), along with the Miners' Welfare. After over 80 years of service Rufford Colliery closed in 1993. The Miners' Welfare remains open, and has subsequent affiliations with the local football team and bowls club. In 1951, 40 council house had been completed, located on Kirklington Road, just beyond Python Hill School. A large housing estate was built in the 1950s, between Station Road and Warsop Lane (the Wimpey estate) and a further estate was built beyond the original council estate on Kirklington Road, sometime after 1965. This estate was built to accommodate families moved from mines in North East England – the estate became known as the Geordie Estate.

In 1975 killer Donald Neilson (the Black Panther) was caught by police officers helped by locals at the chip shop on Southwell Road East in the village.

Demographics
The population for the civil parish of Rainworth was 6,532 at the 2001 census and the population for the Mansfield 012A (Rainworth) area was 1,289, which means a combined population of 7,821.

98% of Rainworth residents were White British. 153 people were from an ethnic minority.

The 2011 census showed:
All residents: 6,879 
Number of households: 2,904 
Average household size: 2.40 
Residents in households: 6,828 
Residents in communal living: 51 
Area:  
Population density:

Governance
The Newark and Sherwood part of Rainworth is a parish in its own right, while the Mansfield part is unparished.

Rainworth is part of Newark and Sherwood and Mansfield councils with the border being near the bridge over Rainworth Water on Southwell Road East. 
The Mansfield area is part of the Ransom Wood ward and is represented by Labour's John Smart. 

In the 2019 local elections to the Newark and Sherwood District Council (NSDC) – the Rainworth North & Rufford ward was won for the Conservatives. The ward is now represented by district councillors - Dr Louis Brailsford and Tom Smith. 

In the 2021 Nottinghamshire County Council elections, the Rainworth and Blidworth County Division was also won by Tom Smith for the Conservatives. 

The Newark and Sherwood section is represented in Parliament by Mark Spencer, a Conservative MP. The Mansfield section is part of the Mansfield constituency, represented by Ben Bradley, also a Conservative.

Education
Joseph Whitaker School is on Warsop Lane.

Lake View Primary School is attached to Joseph Whitaker School.

Python Hill Junior and Infant School was an all ages to 15 school until the building of Joseph Whitaker School.

Heathlands Primary School was built on a temporary basis at the start of the First World War on Southwell Road East but lasted until 2004 when a replacement was built on a nearby site in the village.

Dawn House School, a private school for children with speech and language difficulties, is also located in the village.

Health
Rainworth lies in the Sherwood Forest Hospitals Foundation NHS trust area. Rainworth has its own GPs' surgery called Rainworth Primary Care Centre. The King's Mill Hospital in Sutton-in-Ashfield is the area's local hospital. It has an Accident and Emergency Department. Out of hours GP services are also based at King's Mill.

Culture and recreation

Referred to as the childhood home of the orphaned Mrs Holroyd in The Widowing of Mrs Holroyd by D. H. Lawrence. 

Pubs in Rainworth are the Lurcher on Westbrook Drive, Sherwood Inn on Kirklington Road, the Archer on Warsop Lane and the Robin Hood Inn on Southwell Road East (now a Tesco store) near the Co-op. There are no public houses in the Mansfield side of Rainworth.

Across from the Tesco on Kirklington Road is The Venue, a snooker club in the same building that used to house the old village cinema.

Lindhurst Wind Farm

Rainworth has a five turbine wind farm called Lindhurst Wind Farm which was built in 2010, the wind farm was controversial at the time of building.

This wind farm is on Newark and Sherwood Land in the nearby parish of Lindhurst, but is built within 400 m of the Mansfield District Council part of the village who had no direct say in the planning.

Rainworth Incinerator 
A waste incinerator on the site of the former Rufford Colliery was proposed in 2006 by Veolia Ltd the preferred contractor for Nottinghamshire County Council. This was met with hostile views from many local residents, concerned with the environmental impact and the increased traffic around the village.

Planning permission application was made to Nottinghamshire County Council and to the Environment Agency whose consultation ended in May 2008.

Opposition was from several local environmental groups led by People Against Incineration (PAIN) who obtained the support of David Bellamy.

The application was heard by Nottinghamshire County Council and they approved it despite heavy local opposition, but a public enquiry was put in place. This inquiry sat in October 2009 only to be adjourned until April 2010 and yet again to September 2010 owing to the possibility there being nationally important nesting sites for nightjars and woodlarks among other disputed matters.

On 27 May 2011 the Secretary of State formally turned down the planning application

Veolia then launched an appeal against the Secretary of State's decision but this was eventually withdrawn in October 2012.

Transport
The National Cycle Network travels north to south through Rainworth and into Sherwood Forest.

The main road running through Rainworth is Southwell Road East. The A617, which opened in 2000, by-passes the village to the north.

The village is served by bus routes 27, 28, 28B and 141.

The nearest railway station is Mansfield. The local station, Blidworth and Rainworth, closed in 1965.

The nearest airport is East Midlands.

Media
The local paper covering the area is the Mansfield and Ashfield Chad which has a separate edition for the Sherwood area.

Local for the area radio includes Mansfield 103.2 FM, BBC Radio Nottingham and 96-106 Capital FM. Rainworth receives BBC Radio 1, 2, 3 and 4 from either Holme Moss or Sutton Coldfield.

Rainworth is covered by the Central ITV and BBC East Midlands TV regions broadcast from the Waltham transmitting station.

References

External links

Rainworth Miners' Welfare FC
St Simon & St Jude church
Rainworth Dukeries Rally
Knowhere Guide
Village Hall
Rainworth Parish Council

 
Villages in Nottinghamshire
Civil parishes in Nottinghamshire
Newark and Sherwood
Mansfield